"Yes! We Have No Bananas" is an American novelty song by Frank Silver and Irving Cohn published March 23, 1923. It became a major hit in 1923 (placing No. 1 for five weeks) when it was recorded by Billy Jones, Billy Murray, Arthur Hall, Irving Kaufman, and others.  It was recorded later by Benny Goodman and His Orchestra, Spike Jones & His City Slickers, Kidsongs, and many more.

The song became a best-selling sheet music in American history.  It inspired a follow-up song, "I've Got the Yes! We Have No Bananas Blues", recorded by Billy Jones and Sam Lanin (with vocals by Irving Kaufman and others) in 1923.  Al Jolson recorded on film, an operatic version, in blackface, in the 1930s.

History 
Frank Silver explained the origin of the song to Time Magazine:  "I am an American, of Jewish ancestry, with a wife and a young son. About a year ago my little orchestra was playing at a Long Island hotel. To and from the hotel I was wont to stop at a fruit stand owned by a Greek, who began every sentence with 'Yes'. The jingle of his idiom haunted me and my friend Cohn. Finally I wrote this verse and Cohn fitted it with a tune." 

The song was the theme of the outdoor relief protests in Belfast in 1932.  These were a unique example of Protestants and Catholics in Northern Ireland protesting together, and the song was used because it was one of the few non-sectarian songs that both communities knew. The song lent its title to a book about the depression in Belfast.

The shopkeeper who said "Yes! We Have No Bananas" and inspired this song, may have been one of the many affected by a worldwide crash in the banana crop caused by Panama disease.

The term has been resurrected on many occasions, including during rationing in the United Kingdom in World War II, when the British government banned imports of bananas for five years. Shop owners put signs stating "Yes, we have no bananas" in their shop windows in keeping with the war spirit.

The song was the subject of a column by Sigmund Spaeth, who suggested that the melody could have been derived from a combination of parts of other songs, including the "Hallelujah Chorus" from Messiah by Handel, "My Bonnie Lies Over The Ocean", "I Dreamt I Dwelt in Marble Halls", "Aunt Dinah's Quilting Party", and Cole Porter's "An Old-Fashioned Garden".

Replacing the original lyrics with the appropriate melodic phrases, it becomes:

Spaeth subsequently repeated his argument as an expert witness.

On January 1, 2019, the song entered the public domain in the United States.

References

External links 

 Sheet music
 Sheet music and full lyrics
 Yes We Have No Bananas performed by Billy Murray

1923 songs
1923 singles
American songs
Bananas in popular culture
Belle Baker songs
Benny Goodman songs
Novelty songs
Songs about plants